is a Japanese original video animation (OVA) series directed by Shinichiro Kimura and animated by TNK. It is centered on the after school cosplay club at East Oizumi Academy and follows the girls in the club as they practice so that one day they may be able to compete in cosplay competitions.

Characters

East Oizumi Cosplay Club
 
 
 Chako, a primary character of the anime, is a pink haired girl who is cheerful although clumsy. She joins the cosplay club which is lacking official members. She has an overly bubbly outlook and spawns catchphrases, such as "Have a Chako-riffic day".

 
 
 A small magical bunnygirl, Delmo is able to conjure up cosplay costumes as well as alter the girls' bodies to fit them. This includes enlarging their breasts.

 
 
 Maria is a dark haired bespectacled girl. A miko, she is one of the original members of the club. She is very protective of her little sister, especially from Jenny.

 
 
 Maria's little sister, she is too young to attend the academy but is a part of the cosplay club nonetheless. She is the object of Jenny's sexual desires, though Maria often has a fainting spell whenever the two interact.

 
 
 Reika is stubborn compared to the other cosplayers, sometimes appearing to be unfriendly towards them. She is the leader of the crew and is often exasperated by their inability to focus on their cosplay goals.

 
 
 Jenny is a foreign exchange student from Italy, though is featured as a stereotypical large-chested and blonde American. She also has a Lolita Complex and is attracted to Athena.

 
 
 President and only male member of the cosplay club. He has a tendency to over-act, but is the most skilled cosplayer in the group. He is the only one who knows that Reika wears glasses and has a large crush on her. He has a tendency to read dirty stories aloud, often leading to some awkward character interaction between Reika and himself or another female.

 
 
 A small owl-like creature who is Delmo's friend and assistant. Helps sewing, ironing and helping Chako and Delmo with costumes and usually acts as a judge for cosplay competitions, despite his inability to speak (though everyone understands him just fine).

 
 
 The teacher sponsor of the Cosplay Club. His frequent hospitalization is a running gag.

Other characters
 
 
 A male college student who enjoys photography. Chako's main love interest.

Shin-Takarazuka Academy Cosplay Club
 
 
 The head of the Shin-Takarazuka Academy Cosplay Club, the World Series champions. She is an extremely talented cosplayer, able to modify the bodies of herself and others as well as inject the characters she plays with personality. She is Tsukasa's boss and Kazuke's girlfriend. She is very hard on Tsukasa but sincerely believes in her talent as a cosplayer.

 
 
 A member of the Shin-Takarazuka Cosplay Club, an expert seamstress, and Ranko's assistant. She is very shy and reluctant to participate in cosplay contests. However, she overcomes her fear with the help of Chako and Ranko.

 
 

 Blue-haired woman

 A woman who is first seen leaving purple roses at the grave of Sachiko's late husband. Sachiko is later shocked to see her in the audience at the cosplay battle between Chako and Ranko. On the third and final episode it is revealed that she was the limousine driver for the Shin – Takarazuka Cosplay Club.

Episode list

References

External links

 
 Cosplay Complex Official Website 

2002 anime OVAs
ADV Films
Anime with original screenplays
Cosplay
TNK (company)
Works about fandom